The 1990 Esso RAC British Touring Car Championship season was the 33rd British Touring Car Championship (BTCC) season and marked the last year of the Group A era. It was also the final year of the multi-class format.

Changes for 1990
Classes changed from four to two. Group A cars now ran alongside the all new 2 litre Touring Car Formula, with a view to a single class formula for 1991. This was to encourage new manufacturers to enter the series, with a more even field of cars and cheaper running costs. BMW and Vauxhall already entered works teams this year, with other manufacturers showing interest for future seasons.
One hour endurance races increased from one to two.

Season summary
The first race was won by Andy Rouse in his Ford Sierra RS500. He also won the first 1 Hour endurance race at Donington Park GP with David Sears. The next race at Thruxton was won by Robb Gravett. Gravett also won the next six races including the second 1 Hour endurance race at Brands Hatch with Mike Smith. Rouse won the Birmingham Superprix. This would be best remembered for the last lap accident between Frank Sytner and John Cleland. It would be the last time that the BTCC would race on the track.
Gravett then won at Donington. The last two races, at Thruxton and Silverstone, were won by Rouse and Gravett. 
It was Gravett who won the championship, despite the team's struggle to run through the season on a low budget with no main sponsor.

Teams and drivers